Paweł Miąszkiewicz (born 25 November 1971) is a retired Polish football midfielder.

References

1971 births
Living people
Polish footballers
Gwardia Warsaw players
Widzew Łódź players
Wisła Płock players
GKS Katowice players
Świt Nowy Dwór Mazowiecki
Association football midfielders
Ekstraklasa players